Sugarolly Days is a 1994 album by Jim Diamond.  It is a collection of Scottish folk songs.  Gallagher & Lyle appear on several tracks.

Track listing

"Sugarolly Mountains"  5.59
"The Road to Dundee"  4.10
"One Day Without Fear"  4.45
"Ae Fond Kiss"  3.25
"Coulter's Candy (Ali Bali Be)"  3.39
"The Road to Flodigarry"  4.23
"Caledonia (Heartland)"  3.29
"Wild Mountain Thyme (Will Ye Go Lassie Go)"  3.16
"Eastern Promise"  2.56
"A Red, Red Rose"  2.45
"The Rowan Tree"  3.20
"Skye Boat Song"  4.28

Folk albums by Scottish artists
Jim Diamond (singer) albums
1994 albums